Begood Toya Mother (25 August 2014 – 7 September 2022) was a Group 1 winning Australian thoroughbred racehorse.

Background
The gelding was purchased at the 2016 Adelaide Magic Millions yearling sale for A$28,000.

Racing career
The horse was successful in the Group 1 2019 Sir Rupert Clarke Stakes at Caulfield Racecourse.  Ridden by Irish jockey Declan Bates, he won at the odds of 2/1 by 1.25 lengths.

Pedigree

References 

2014 racehorse births
2022 racehorse deaths
Australian racehorses
Racehorses bred in Australia
Racehorses trained in Australia